Elko County School District (ECSD) is a school district headquartered in Elko, Nevada. It includes all of Elko County.

History
The board of trustees, by 2022, was considering holding classes for only four days per week instead of five in the schools of Elko and Spring Creek. In 2022 a survey stated that the percentages of the combined sum of employees, parents, and students who supported this change ranged from 66% to 75%.

In 2022 the board of trustees voted to appoint Clayton Anderson as the district superintendent.

Schools
 K-12 schools (known as "combined schools")
 Carlin Combined School
 Jackpot Combined School
 Owhyhee Combined School
 Wells Combined School - Has two separate campuses for elementary and secondary levels.

 High schools
 Elko High School
 Spring Creek High School
 West Wendover High School

 Middle schools (all have grades 7 and 8)
 Adobe Middle School
 Spring Creek Middle School (also has the 6th grade)
 West Wendover Middle School

 Elementary schools
 Grades 5-6:
 Flag View Intermediate School
 Kindergarten - Grade 5:
 Liberty Peak Elementary School
 Sage Elementary School
 Spring Creek Elementary School
 PK- Grade 4:
 Grammar #2 Elementary School
 Southside Elementary School
 K-4:
 Mountain View Elementary School
 Northside Elementary School
 Other:
 West Wendover Elementary School

 Rural schools
 Independence Valley Rural School
 Montello Rural School
 Mound Valley Rural School
 Ruby Valley Rural School

References

External links
 Elko County School District

Education in Elko County, Nevada
School districts in Nevada